In Greek mythology, Ceryx  ( Kērux, literally "herald") was a member of the Athenian royal family as the son of Hermes by either the princesses, Pandrosus or Agraulus.

Mythology 
Ceryx was, like his father, a messenger. But the kêryx career began as a humble cook for the tribe, a skill Hermes demonstrates in his cooked meat offerings on the Twelve Gods Altar set in place 522BC by Peisistratos III in Athens. The Homeric Hymn to Hermes 128 recalls the young god cutting out and laying up twelve steaks on a flat rock or platamoni," the 12 Gods altar.

According to Pausanias, Ceryx was the youngest son of Eumolpus, one of the first priests of Demeter at Eleusis and a founder of the Eleusinian Mysteries. He founded the two families of high priests in Eleusis: the ceryces (or Ceryces), a family of priests in Athens, and the Eumolpidae.

Ceryces

In Homer’s time, ceryx was a profession of trusted attendants or retainers of a chieftain. The role of ceryces  expanded, however, to include acting as inviolable messengers between states, even in time of war, proclaiming meetings of the council, popular assembly, or court of law, reciting there the formulas of prayer, and summoning persons to attend. Hermes, himself the ceryx of the gods, was their patron and carried the caduceus (Latin corruption of Ancient Greek kerykeion), the herald’s staff.

In popular culture
 Ceryx appears in the mobile game God of War: Betrayal and serves as the game's final boss. He attempted to warn Kratos about the consequences of his bloody rampage across Greece. Kratos killed him for interfering in his pursuit of the mysterious assassin.

Notes

References 

 Hard, Robin, The Routledge Handbook of Greek Mythology: Based on H.J. Rose's "Handbook of Greek Mythology", Psychology Press, 2004, . Google Books.
 Parada, Carlos, Genealogical Guide to Greek Mythology, Jonsered, Paul Åströms Förlag, 1993. .
 Pausanias, Description of Greece with an English Translation by W.H.S. Jones, Litt.D., and H.A. Ormerod, M.A., in 4 Volumes. Cambridge, MA, Harvard University Press; London, William Heinemann Ltd. 1918. . Online version at the Perseus Digital Library
 Pausanias, Graeciae Descriptio. 3 vols. Leipzig, Teubner. 1903.  Greek text available at the Perseus Digital Library.

Greek mythological heroes
Eleusinian characters in Greek mythology
Attican characters in Greek mythology